The 5th IAAF World Cup in Athletics was an international track and field sporting event sponsored by the International Association of Athletics Federations, held on September 8–10, 1989, at the Estadi Olímpic Lluís Companys in Barcelona, Spain.

Overall results

Medal summary

Men

Women

References
World Cup Results
Full Results by IAAF

IAAF Continental Cup
World Cup
IAAF World Cup
Athletics competitions in Catalonia
International sports competitions hosted by Catalonia
International athletics competitions hosted by Spain
Athletics in Barcelona